Manasses IV, Count of Rethel (died 1199) was a son of Guitier of Rethel and Beatrice of Namur.  He succeeded his father as Count of Rethel in 1171. He is probably the Count of Rethel who was responsible for despoiling churches in the early reign of Philip II of France.

Manasses IV was married to Matilda of Upper Lorraine and was the father of Hugh II.

References

Counts of Rethel
12th-century births
Year of birth unknown
1199 deaths
12th-century French people